The 2012–13 UC Santa Barbara Gauchos men's basketball team represented the University of California, Santa Barbara during the 2012–13 NCAA Division I men's basketball season. The Gauchos, led by 15th year head coach Bob Williams, played their home games at the UC Santa Barbara Events Center, nicknamed The Thunderdome, and were members of the Big West Conference. They finished the season 11–20, 7–11 in Big West play to finish in seventh place. They lost in the quarterfinals of the Big West tournament to Pacific.

Roster

Schedule

|-
!colspan=9| Exhibition

|-
!colspan=9| Regular season

|-
!colspan=9| 2013 Big West Conference men's basketball tournament

References

UC Santa Barbara Gauchos men's basketball seasons
UC Santa Barbara
UC Santa Barbara Gauchos men's basketball team
UC Santa Barbara Gauchos men's basketball team